The 2009 Tail Savannah Challenger was a professional tennis tournament played on outdoor green clay courts. It was part of the 2009 ATP Challenger Tour. It took place in Savannah, United States between May 4 and May 10, 2009.

Singles entrants

Seeds

 Rankings are as of April 27, 2009.

Other entrants
The following players received wildcards into the singles main draw:
  Stephen Bass
  Nicholas Monroe
  Jesse Witten
  Fritz Wolmarans

The following players received entry from the qualifying draw:
  Ričardas Berankis
  Chris Klingemann
  Tim Smyczek
  Adam Vejmělka (as a Lucky loser)

Champions

Singles

 Michael Russell def.  Alex Kuznetsov, 6–4, 7–6(6)

Doubles

 Carsten Ball /  Travis Rettenmaier def.  Harsh Mankad /  Kaes Van't Hof, 7–6(4), 6–4

External links
2009 Draws
Official website
ITF search 

2009 ATP Challenger Tour
2008,Tail Savannah Challenger
2008
2009 in American tennis